Club de Gimnasia y Esgrima (also known for its acronym GEBA) is an Argentine multi-sports club placed in the city of Buenos Aires. The institution is one of the oldest in the country, having been established in 1880. Gimnasia y Esgrima is also one of the largest clubs of Argentina, with around 30 different disciplines hosted in the three buildings that the institution owns in Buenos Aires.

History
The institution was founded as "Club Cosmopolita de Gimnasia y Esgrima" on 11 November 1880, by fencing  and gymnastics enthusiasts in the "Confitería del Aguila", a traditional coffee house of Buenos Aires. Léon Marchand was designed as the first president of the club.

Three years later, in 1883, the club changed its name to "Club de Gimnasia y Esgrima". In 1909 Ricardo Camilo Aldao became president of the institution.

The football team took part in the Primera División championships since 1909, when the squad won the second division title, therefore promoting to the top division. Gimnasia played in Primera from 1910 to 1917 when the team was relegated to the División Intermedia (second division) after finishing 20th of 21 teams. The club disaffiliated from the Association soon later, although football has remained as one of the sports practised up to present days.

In 1912, Gimnasia y Esgrima was part of the first break up in Argentine football, due to a conflict caused by the position of the club about the sales of tickets for football matches. Gimnasia stated that its members should not pay for tickets because of their membership, which allowed them to take part in all the activities, including free access to the stadium. The club also claimed a higher percentage of the income for tickets sold. The conflict persisted until Gimnasia decided to disaffiliate from the Association on July 14, 1912, establishing a new league, the "Federación Argentina de Football", presided by Ricardo Aldao himself.

Other clubs followed Gimnasia y Esgrima joining the new league, such as Porteño, Estudiantes de La Plata, Independiente, and other teams from the second division. The new league organized its own championships from 1912 to 1915, when both leagues merged into the "Asociación Argentina de Football", putting an end to the conflict.

The club's stadium (which has a capacity of 18,000 spectators) was the field where the Argentina national team played its home games since 1910, making its debut during the Copa Centenario Revolución de Mayo held there. In the final match of that tournament, played against Uruguay, a riot occurred after the suspension of the match was announced, and part of the grandstands –made of wood– were destroyed by fire. After the stadium was rebuilt, many football games held there, even when Gimnasia had disaffiliated from the Association.

In 1920 Gimnasia y Esgrima disaffiliated from all the football associations of Argentina to organize its own championships. By 1928 GyE had more than 120 members with 8 teams formed. Ten years later there were more than 400 members registered to play football. Because of the growth of the activity, the club built one field more.

After leaving the official football leagues in the decade of 1920, rugby union was one of the predominant sports of Gimnasia y Esgrima, winning the Torneo de la URBA titles of 1911 and 1912. The club won two more titles in 1932 and 1939, its last championship to date. Gimnasia y Esgrima currently plays in the Grupo II, the second division of the Unión de Rugby de Buenos Aires league system.

In 1942 president Aldao moved to the club's distinguished guest apartment, establishing it as its permanent home. The only condition required by Aldao to live there was the payment of a monthly rent which would be 6% of the investments made by the club when the apartment was built. In 1947 and after 40 years as president of the institution, Aldao resigned due he was afraid of a possible intervention of the Argentine military government in the club.

Gimnasia has gained a good reputation in women's field hockey due to its successful campaigns during the decade of the 2000, having won 7 Torneo Metropolitano titles, six of them consecutively being the last in 2012.

In September 2014, the rugby union senior squad returned to the first division (Grupo I) after defeating Manuel Belgrano by 23–16 at playoffs (Zona Reubicación). The team had been relegated in 2007.

Facilities 
The club has three facilities to host the practice of different sports. All of them are located in the city of Buenos Aires.

 San Martín: The biggest facility, with 139,000 m2, on Figueroa Alcorta avenue. Some of the sports practiced there are football, roller skating, rugby union, table tennis and volleyball.
 Aldao: named in honour of Ricardo Aldao (1863–1956), one of the most prominent presidents of the institution, also the founder of the dissident league "Federación Argentina de Football" in 1912. Aldao also donated the trophy (named "Copa Aldao") for the tournament held from 1913 to 1955 played between Argentine and Uruguayan association teams. With 35,000 m2, the facility is located on Bartolomé Mitre street of the city of Buenos Aires. The sports practiced there are basque pelota, boxing, contract bridge, chess, martial arts, artistic gymnastics and yoga.
 Jorge Newbery: named honoring Argentine aviation pioneer Jorge Newbery, who was also a notable fencer (he won the first South American championship at Gimnasia y Esgrima in 1901), died in 1914. The facility occupies 55,000 m2 on Dorrego Avenue, near to Galileo Galilei planetarium in the Palermo district. Athletics, swimming and water polo are some of the sports hosted there. Here is located the club stadium, where the football and rugby union teams from the club played their home games. The Argentina national rugby union team also played there in the 1970s. The stadium (known in Argentina as "Estadio GEBA") is currently used for concerts.

Stadium

The "Estadio GEBA" is the main venue of the club, with a capacity for 12,000 spectators.

Placed in the "Jorge Newbery" seat, it was the main football venue during the 1900s and 1910s, having held matches of the Argentina national team. The football team of the club (that played in Primera División from 1911 to 1917) also used the stadium for its home games. After the arson of 1916, the stadium would be used for rugby union purposes mainly. Nowadays, Estadio GEBA is used for music concerts, having host a large number of artist performing there.

Notable athletes

Uniforms
Gimnasia y Esgrima's teams have also worn a white jersey with a horizontal light blue band. The most used alternate jersey has been the dark blue model, leaving the horizontal band the same as the original.

Honours

Basketball
 Primera División (2): 2006, 2014

Football
 Segunda División (1): 1909
 Copa Bullrich (1): 1907
 Tercera División (2): 1906, 1912

Field hockey
Women's
 Metropolitano de Primera División (9): 1965, 2007, 2008, 2009, 2010, 2011, 2012, 2013, 2017

Rugby union
 RPRU (4): 1911, 1912, 1932, 1939

References

External links

 

Sports clubs established in 1880
Football clubs in Buenos Aires
g
Rugby union clubs in Buenos Aires
Rugby clubs established in 1880
Multi-sport clubs in Argentina
1880 establishments in Argentina
G
G